Melanie Neige Scrofano is a Canadian actress. She is known for playing Mrs. McMurray on the Crave comedy series Letterkenny, Rebecca on the CBC comedy-drama series Being Erica, October on the Showcase mockumentary series Pure Pwnage, and Tia on the CTV fantasy-drama series The Listener. From 2016 to 2021, Scrofano starred as the title character on the Syfy modern Western drama Wynonna Earp. In 2019, she played Emilie in the comedy horror film Ready or Not.

Early life 
Scrofano was born in Ottawa, Ontario, the daughter of a government worker mother and an engineer father. She is of French-Canadian and Italian descent. She began modeling at the age of 13, and picked up acting when her agent began submitting her for acting jobs.

Personal life 
It was revealed in a July 2017 Variety article that Scrofano was pregnant for the duration of filming the second season of Wynonna Earp. She gave birth to a son in April 2017, shortly after production on the season had wrapped.

Filmography

Film

Television

Awards and nominations

References

External links 
 
 

Living people
Actresses from Ottawa
Canadian people of Italian descent
Canadian television actresses
Canadian film actresses
Year of birth missing (living people)
21st-century Canadian actresses
Canadian people of French descent